Route 67 is a  north–south (though geographically more northeast-southwest) highway in western and central Massachusetts. Its southern terminus is at U.S. Route 20 (US 20) in Palmer and its northern terminus is at Route 32 in Barre.

Route description
Route 67 begins at U.S. Route 20 in Palmer near the Palmer/Monson town line. The highway runs north and east along the Quaboag River and under Interstate 90/Mass Pike, without an intersection. Route 67 becomes concurrent with Route 19 in the center of Warren, running in a northeasterly direction for approximately three miles. At the intersection with Route 9 in West Brookfield along the southern shore of Wickaboag Pond, Route 19 ends and Route 67 turns east, running concurrent with Route 9 for approximately one mile to the center of West Brookfield. Route 67 then runs in a northeasterly direction into North Brookfield and becomes concurrent with Route 148 for about one mile (1.6 km) to the center of North Brookfield. After the concurrency ends, Route 67 goes through New Braintree and ends at Route 32 in Barre.

History
In 1930, the section of Route 67 from U.S. Route 20 to Route 9 was part of US 20. By 1933, that section was unnumbered and Route 67 had been assigned to the road from East Brookfield to Barre. By 1939, Route 67 was shifted to its current routing.

Major intersections

References

Neilbert.com Massachusetts Route Log

067
Transportation in Hampden County, Massachusetts
Transportation in Worcester County, Massachusetts
U.S. Route 20